Latin declension is the set of patterns according to which Latin words are declined—that is, have their endings altered to show grammatical case, number and gender. Nouns, pronouns, and adjectives are declined (verbs are conjugated), and a given pattern is called a declension. There are five declensions, which are numbered and grouped by ending and grammatical gender. Each noun follows one of the five declensions, but some irregular nouns have exceptions.

Adjectives are of two kinds: those like  'good' use first-declension endings for the feminine, and second-declension for masculine and neuter. Other adjectives such as  belong to the third declension. There are no fourth- or fifth-declension adjectives.

Pronouns are also of two kinds, the personal pronouns such as  'I' and  'you', which have their own irregular declension, and the third-person pronouns such as  'this' and  'that' which can generally be used either as pronouns or adjectivally. These latter decline in a similar way to the first and second noun declensions, but there are differences; for example the genitive singular ends in -īus or -ius instead of -ī or -ae.

The cardinal numbers  'one',  'two', and  'three' also have their own declensions (ūnus has genitive -īus like a pronoun). However, numeral adjectives such as  'a pair, two each' decline like ordinary adjectives.

Grammatical cases 
A complete Latin noun declension consists of up to seven grammatical cases: nominative, vocative, accusative, genitive, dative, ablative and locative. However, the locative is limited to a few nouns: generally names of cities, small islands and a few other words.

The case names are often abbreviated to the first three letters, for example, "nom." for "nominative".

Order of cases
The grammarian Aelius Donatus (4th century AD), whose work was used as standard throughout the Middle Ages, placed the cases in this order:

"There are six cases: nominative, genitive, dative, accusative, vocative and ablative."

This order was based on the order used by earlier Greek grammarians, with the addition of the ablative, which does not exist in Greek.

The traditional order was formerly used in England, for example in The School and University Eton Latin Grammar (1861). and it is also still used in Germany and most European countries. Gildersleeve and Lodge's Latin Grammar of 1895, also follows this order. More recent American grammars, such as Allen and Greenough's New Latin Grammar (1903) and Wheelock's Latin (first published in 1956), use this order but with the vocative at the end. 

However, in Britain and countries influenced by Britain, the Latin cases are usually given in the following order: nominative, vocative, accusative, genitive, dative, ablative. This order was first introduced in Benjamin Hall Kennedy's Latin Primer (1866), with the aim of making tables of declensions easier to recite and memorise (the first three and the last two cases having identical forms in several declensions). It is also used in France and Belgium.

Syncretism

Syncretism, where one form in a paradigm shares the ending of another form in the paradigm, is common in Latin. The following are the most notable patterns of syncretism:

Gender-specific
 For pure Latin neuter nouns, the nominative singular, vocative singular, and accusative singular are identical; and the nominative plural, vocative plural, and accusative plural all end in -a. (Both of these features are inherited from Proto-Indo-European, and so no actual syncretism is known to have happened in the historical sense, since these cases of these nouns are not known to have ever been different in the first place.)

Case-specific
 The vocative form is always the same as the nominative in the plural, and usually the same as the nominative in the singular except for second-declension masculine nouns ending in -us and a few nouns of Greek origin.
 The genitive singular is the same as the nominative plural in first-, second-, and fourth-declension masculine and feminine pure Latin nouns.
 The dative singular is the same as the genitive singular in first- and fifth-declension pure Latin nouns.
 The dative is always the same as the ablative in the singular in the second declension, the third-declension full i-stems (i.e. neuter i-stems, adjectives), and fourth-declension neuters.
 The dative, ablative, and locative are always identical in the plural.
 The locative is identical to the ablative in the fourth and fifth declensions.

History of cases 
Old Latin had essentially two patterns of endings. One pattern was shared by the first and second declensions, which derived from the Proto-Indo-European thematic declension. The other pattern was used by the third, fourth and fifth declensions, and derived from the athematic PIE declension.

Nouns 
There are two principal parts for Latin nouns: the nominative singular and the genitive singular. Each declension can be unequivocally identified by the ending of the genitive singular (-ae, -i, -is, -ūs, -ei). The stem of the noun can be identified by the form of the genitive singular as well.

There are five declensions for Latin nouns:

First declension (a stems) 
Nouns of this declension usually end in -a in the nominative singular and are mostly feminine, e.g. There is a small class of masculine exceptions generally referring to occupations, e.g.

The predominant letter in the ending forms of this declension is a. The nominative singular form consists of the stem and the ending -a, and the genitive singular form is the stem plus -ae.

The locative endings for the first declension are -ae (singular) and -īs (plural), similar to the genitive singular and ablative plural, as in  'in war' and  'at Athens'.

First declension Greek nouns 

The first declension also includes three types of Greek loanwords, derived from Ancient Greek's alpha declension. They are declined irregularly in the singular, but sometimes treated as native Latin nouns, e.g. nominative  ('athlete') instead of the original athlētēs. Archaic (Homeric) first declension Greek nouns and adjectives had been formed in exactly the same way as in Latin: nephelēgeréta Zeus ('Zeus the cloud-gatherer') had in classical Greek become nephelēgerétēs.

For full paradigm tables and more detailed information, see the Wiktionary appendix First declension.

Second declension (o stems) 
There are several small groups of feminine exceptions, including names of gemstones, plants, trees, and some towns and cities.

In the nominative singular, most masculine nouns consist of the stem and the ending -us, although some end in -er, which is not necessarily attached to the complete stem. Neuter nouns generally have a nominative singular consisting of the stem and the ending -um. However, every second-declension noun has the ending -ī attached as a suffix to the root of the noun in the genitive singular form. The predominant letter in the ending forms of this declension is o.

The locative endings for the second declension are -ī (singular) and -īs (plural);  "at Corinth",  "at Milan", and  "at Philippi".

Second-declension -ius and -ium nouns 
Nouns ending in -ius and -ium have a genitive singular in -ī in earlier Latin, which was regularized to -iī in the later language. Masculine nouns in -ius have a vocative singular in -ī at all stages. These forms in -ī are stressed on the same syllable as the nominative singular, sometimes in violation of the usual Latin stress rule. For example, the genitive and vocative singular Vergilī (from ) is pronounced Vergílī, with stress on the penult, even though it is short. In Old Latin, however, the vocative was declined regularly, using -ie instead, e.g. fīlie "[O] son", archaic vocative of fīlius.

There is no contraction of -iī(s) in plural forms and in the locative.

In the older language, nouns ending with -vus, -quus and -vum take o rather than u in the nominative and accusative singular. For example,  ('slave') could be servos, accusative servom.

Second-declension -r nouns 
Some masculine nouns of the second declension end in -er or -ir in the nominative singular. The declension of these nouns is identical to that of the regular second declension, except for the lack of suffix in the nominative and vocative singular.

Some (but not all) nouns in -er drop the e genitive and other cases. For example,  ('father-in-law') keeps its e. However, the noun  ('(school)master') drops its e in the genitive singular. 

For declension tables of second-declension nouns, see the corresponding Wiktionary appendix.

The vocative puere is found but only in Plautus. The genitive plural virum is found in poetry.

Second-declension Greek nouns 

The second declension contains two types of masculine Greek nouns and one form of neuter Greek noun. These nouns are irregular only in the singular, as are their first-declension counterparts. Greek nouns in the second declension are derived from the Omicron declension.

Some Greek nouns may also be declined as normal Latin nouns. For example,  can appear as theātrum.

Irregular forms

Deus 
The vocative singular of deus is not attested in Classical Latin. In Ecclesiastical Latin the vocative of Deus ('God') is Deus.

In poetry, -um may substitute -ōrum as the genitive plural ending.

Virus 
The Latin word vīrus (the ī indicates a long i) means "1. slimy liquid, slime; 2. poison, venom", denoting the venom of a snake. This Latin word is probably related to the Greek  (ios) meaning "venom" or "rust" and the Sanskrit word   meaning "toxic, poison".

Since vīrus in antiquity denoted something uncountable, it was a mass noun. Mass nouns pluralize only under special circumstances, hence the non-existence of plural forms in the texts.

In Neo-Latin, a plural form is necessary in order to express the modern concept of ‘viruses’, which leads to the following declension:

Third declension
The third declension is the largest group of nouns. The nominative singular of these nouns may end in -a, -e, -ī, -ō, -y, -c, -l, -n, -r, -s, -t, or -x. This group of nouns includes masculine, neuter, and feminine nouns.

Consonant stems
The stem of a consonant-stem noun may be found from the genitive case by removing the ending -is. For example, the stem of   'peace' is pāc-, the stem of   'river' is flūmin-, and the stem of   'flower' is flōr-.

Masculine, feminine and neuter nouns often have their own special nominative singular endings. For instance, many masculine nouns end in -or ('love'). Many feminine nouns end in -īx ('phoenix'), and many neuter nouns end in -us with an r stem in the oblique cases ( 'burden';  'time').

The locative endings for the third declension are -ī or -e (singular) and -ibus (plural), as in  'in the country' and  'at Tralles'.

Third declension i-stem and mixed nouns 
The third declension also has a set of nouns that are declined differently. They are called i-stems. i-stems are broken into two subcategories: pure and mixed. Pure i-stems are indicated by special neuter endings. Mixed i-stems are indicated by the double consonant rule. Stems indicated by the parisyllabic rule are usually mixed, occasionally pure.
Masculine and feminine
Parisyllabic rule: Some masculine and feminine third-declension i-stem nouns have the same number of syllables in the genitive as they do in the nominative. For example:  ('ship');  ('cloud'). The nominative ends in -is or -ēs.
Double consonant rule: The rest of the masculine and feminine third-declension i-stem nouns have two consonants before the -is in the genitive singular. For example:  ('part').
Neuter
Special neuter ending: Neuter third-declension i-stems have no rule. However, all of them end in -al, -ar or -e. For example:  ('animal');  ('spoon');  ('sea').

The mixed declension is distinguished from the consonant type only by having -ium in the genitive plural (and occasionally -īs in the accusative plural). The pure declension is characterized by having -ī in the ablative singular, -ium in the genitive plural, -ia in the nominative and accusative plural neuter, and -im in the accusative singular masculine and feminine (however, adjectives have -em).

The accusative plural ending -īs is found in early Latin up to Virgil, but from the early empire onwards it was replaced by -ēs.

The accusative singular ending -im is found only in a few words: always in  'cough',  'thirst',  'River Tiber'; usually in  'axe',  'tower'; occasionally in  'ship'. Most nouns, however, have accusative singular -em.

The ablative singular -ī is found in nouns which have -im, and also, optionally, in some other nouns, e.g.  or  'in the fire'.

Also, the mixed declension is used in the plural-only adjective   ('most').

This fluidity even in Roman times resulted in much more uncertainty in Medieval Latin.

Some nouns in -tāt-, such as  'city, community' can have either consonant-stem or i-stem genitive plural:  or  'of the cities'.

Peculiarities 
In the third declension, there are four irregular nouns.

Fourth declension (u stems) 
The fourth declension also includes several neuter nouns including   ('knee'). Each noun has the ending -ūs as a suffix attached to the root of the noun in the genitive singular form. The predominant letter in the ending forms of this declension is u, but the declension is otherwise very similar to the third-declension i stems.

 In the genitive singular, cornūs may in later times be replaced by cornū.

 The locative endings for the fourth declension are -ī (singular) and -ibus (plural);  "at [the] senate",  "at home".

Domus
 ('house, dwelling, building, home, native place, family, household, race') is an irregular noun, mixing fourth and second declension nouns at the same time (especially in literature). However, in practice, it is generally declined as a regular -us stem fourth declension noun (except by the ablative singular and accusative plural, using -ō and -ōs instead).

Fifth declension (e stems) 
The fifth declension is a small group of nouns consisting of mostly feminine nouns like   ('affair, matter, thing') and diēs, diēī  ('day'; but  in names of days). Each noun has either the ending -ēī or -eī as a suffix attached to the root of the noun in the genitive singular form.

Nouns ending in -iēs have long ēī in the dative and genitive, while nouns ending in a consonant + -ēs have short eī in these cases.

Pronouns

Personal pronouns 
The first and second persons are irregular, and both pronouns are indeclinable for gender; and the third person reflexive pronoun sē, suī always refers back to the subject, regardless of whether the subject is singular or plural.

The vocative singular masculine of meus is mī: mī Attice 'my dear Atticus'.

Possessive pronouns' declensions 

The possessive adjective vester has an archaic variant, voster; similar to noster.

Usually, to show the ablative of accompaniment,  would be added to the ablative form. However, with personal pronouns (first and second person), the reflexive and the interrogative, -cum is added onto the end of the ablative form.

Pronouns have also an emphatic form bi using the suffix -met (/), used in all cases, except by the genitive plural forms.

In accusative case, the forms mēmē and tētē exist as emphatic, but they are not widely used.

 has a possessive adjective: , meaning 'his/her/its/their own':

Patrem suum numquam vīderat. (Cicero)
"He had never seen his [own] father."

When 'his' or 'her' refers to someone else, not the subject, the genitive pronoun eius (as well as eōrum and eārum) 'of him' is used instead of suus:
Fit obviam Clodiō ante fundum eius. (Cicero)
"He met Clodius in front of the latter's farm."

When one sentence is embedded inside another with a different subject, sē and suus can refer to either subject:
Patrēs conscrīptī ... lēgātōs in Bīthȳniam miserunt quī ab rēge peterent, nē inimīcissimum suum secum haberet sibique dēderet. (Nepos)
"The senators ... sent ambassadors to Bithynia, who were to ask the king not to keep their greatest enemy with him but hand him over to them."

For the third-person pronoun  'he', see below.

Demonstrative pronouns and adjectives 

Relative, demonstrative and indefinite pronouns are generally declined like first and second declension adjectives, with the following differences:
 the nominatives are often irregular
 the genitive singular ends in -īus rather than -ae or -ī.
 the dative singular ends in -ī: rather than -ae or -ō.

These differences characterize the pronominal declension, and a few special adjectives ( 'whole',  'alone',  'one',  'no',  'another',  'another [of two]', etc.) are also declined according to this pattern.

All demonstrative, relative, and indefinite pronouns in Latin can also be used adjectivally, with some small differences; for example in the interrogative pronoun,  'who?' and  'what?' are usually used for the pronominal form,  and  'which?' for the adjectival form.

Third person pronoun

This pronoun is also often used adjectivally, e.g. is homo 'that man', ea pecunia 'that money'. It has no possessive adjective; the genitive is used instead: pater eius 'his/her father'; pater eōrum 'their father'.

Declension of īdem 
The pronoun or pronominal adjective  means 'the same'. It is derived from is with the suffix -dem. However, some forms have been assimilated.

Other demonstrative pronouns

Similar in declension is  'another'.

Intensive pronoun

Interrogative pronouns 
The interrogative pronouns are used strictly for asking questions. They are distinct from the relative pronoun and the interrogative adjective (which is declined like the relative pronoun). Interrogative pronouns rarely occur in the plural. The plural interrogative pronouns are the same as the plural relative pronouns.

Relative pronouns

Adjectives

First- and second-declension adjectives 
First- and second-declension adjectives are inflected in the masculine, the feminine and the neuter; the masculine form typically ends in -us (although some end in -er, see below), the feminine form ends in -a, and the neuter form ends in -um. Therefore, some adjectives are given like .

Adjectives ending -ius use the vocative -ie (ēbrie, "[O] drunk man", vocative of ēbrius), just as in Old Latin all -ius nouns did (fīlie, "[O] son", archaic vocative of fīlius).

First- and second-declension -r adjectives 
Some first- and second-declension adjectives' masculine forms end in -er. As with second-declension -r nouns, some adjectives retain the e throughout inflection, and some omit it.  omits its e while  keeps it.

First and second declension pronominal adjectives 
Nine first and second declension pronominal adjectives are irregular in the genitive and the dative in all genders. They can be remembered by using the mnemonic acronym ūnus nauta. They are:

 'any';
 'no, none';
 'which [of two], either';
 'sole, alone';
 'neither';
 'another' (the genitive singular alīus is often replaced by alterīus or by aliēnus 'of another');
 'one';
 'whole';
 'other [of two]'.

Third-declension adjectives 
Third-declension adjectives are normally declined like third-declension i-stem nouns, except for the fact they usually have -ī rather than -e in the ablative singular (unlike i-stem nouns, in which only pure i-stems have -ī). Some adjectives, however, like the one-ending  ('old, aged'), have -e in the ablative singular, -um in the genitive plural, and -a in the nominative and accusative neuter plural.

Third-declension adjectives with one ending
These have a single nominative ending for all genders, although as usual the endings for the other cases vary. As with nouns, a genitive is given for the purpose of showing the inflection.

Non-i-stem variant

Third-declension adjectives with two endings 
Third-declension adjectives that have two endings have one form for the masculine and feminine, and a separate form for the neuter. The ending for the masculine and feminine is -is, and the ending for the neuter is -e. It is not necessary to give the genitive, as it is the same as the nominative masculine singular.

Third-declension adjectives with three endings 
Third-declension adjectives with three endings have three separate nominative forms for all three genders. Like third and second declension -r nouns, the masculine ends in -er. The feminine ends in -ris, and the neuter ends in -re. The genitive is the same as the nominative feminine singular.

Comparative and superlative forms of adjectives 
As in English, adjectives have superlative and comparative forms. For regular first and second declension and third declension adjectives with one or two endings, the comparative is formed by adding -ior for the masculine and feminine, and -ius for the neuter to the stem. The genitives for both are formed by adding -iōris. Therefore, they are declined in the third declension, but they are not declined as i-stems. Superlatives are formed by adding -issimus, -issima, -issimum to the stem and are thus declined like first and second declension adjectives.

General pattern for comparatives

Comparatives and superlatives with normal endings

Comparatives and superlatives of -er adjectives 
Adjectives (in the first and second as well as third declensions) that have masculine nominative singular forms ending in -er are slightly different. As with normal adjectives, the comparative is formed by adding -ior to the stem, but for the superlative, -rimus is added to the nominative masculine singular.

Comparatives and superlatives of -lis adjectives 
Some third declension adjectives with two endings in -lis in the masculine–feminine nominative singular have irregular superlative forms. The following are the only adjectives that do.

{| class="wikitable"   style="background: #f9f9f9; border: 1px #aaa solid; border-collapse: collapse; font-size: 100%;"
!bgcolor="EFEFEF" style="text-align: center" |Positive||bgcolor="EFEFEF"|Comparative||bgcolor="EFEFEF"|Superlative
|-
| ('easy')||||
|-
| ('hard, difficult')||||
|-
| ('similar, like)||||
|-
| ('unlike, dissimilar')||||
|-
| ('slender, slim')||||
|-
| ('low, humble')||||
|}

 Comparatives and superlatives of -eus/-ius adjectives 
First and second declension adjectives that end in -eus or -ius are unusual in that they do not form the comparative and superlative by taking endings at all.

Many adjectives in -uus, except those in -quus or -guus, also follow this rule.

 Irregular comparatives and superlatives 
As in most languages, Latin has adjectives that have irregular comparatives and superlatives.

 Declension of numerals 

There are several different kinds of numeral words in Latin: the two most common are cardinal numerals and ordinal numerals. There are also several more rare numerals, e.g., distributive numerals and adverbial numerals.

 Cardinal numerals 

The plural endings for ūnus are used with plūrālia tantum nouns, e. g. ūna castra (one [military] camp), ūnae scālae (one ladder).

The word  ('both'), is declined like duo except that its o is long. Both declensions derive from the Indo-European dual number, otherwise defunct in Latin, rather than the plural.

The numeral  ('one hundred') is indeclinable, but all the other hundred numerals are declinable.

The word mīlle 'thousand' is a singular indeclinable adjective. However, its plural, mīlia, is a plural third-declension i-stem neuter noun. To write the phrase "four thousand horses" in Latin, the genitive is used: quattuor mīlia equōrum, literally, "four thousands of horses".

The rest of the numbers are indeclinable whether used as adjectives or as nouns.

For further information on the different sets of Latin numerals, see Latin numerals (linguistics).

 Adverbs and their comparatives and superlatives 
Adverbs are not declined. However, adverbs must be formed if one wants to make an adjective into an adverb.

 Adverbs from first- and second-declension adjectives 
First and second declension adjectives' adverbs are formed by adding -ē onto their stems.

 Adverbs from third declension adjectives 
Typically, third declension adjectives' adverbs are formed by adding -iter to the stem. However, most third declension adjectives with one ending simply add -er to the stem.

 Comparative and superlative of adverbs 
Adverbs' comparative forms are identical to the nominative neuter singular of the corresponding comparative adjective. Adverbs' superlative forms are simply formed by attaching the regular ending -ē to the corresponding superlative adjective.

 Irregular adverbs and their comparative and superlative forms 
As with adjectives, there are irregular adverbs with peculiar comparative and superlative forms.

 Peculiarities within declension 

 Irregularity in number 
Some nouns are only used in the singular (singulare tantum) such as:
 materials, such as  'gold'
Some nouns are only used in the plural (plurale tantum), or when plural have a singular meaning such as:
 many festivals, such as  'Saturnalia'
  'camp' and  'arms';  'a letter' (cf.  'letter of the alphabet')
 a few geographical names are plural such as  'Thebes' (both the Greek and the Egyptian cities)

 Indeclinable nouns 
Indeclinable nouns are nouns which only have one form in all cases (of the singular).
  ('divine law')
  ('likeness')
  ('morning')
  ('sin, abomination')
  ('(male or female) sex')

 Heterogeneous nouns 
Heterogeneous nouns are nouns which vary in respect to gender.

 A few nouns in the second declension occur in both the neuter and masculine. However, their meanings remain the same.
 Some nouns are one gender in the singular, but become another gender in the plural. They may also change in meaning.

 Plurals with alternative meanings 

 See also 
 Declension of Greek nouns in Latin
 Latin conjugation
 Latin mnemonics
 William Whitaker's Words
 Greek declension

 Notes 

 References 
 New Latin Grammar, an eBook, originally written by Charles Edwin Bennett, at the Project Gutenberg
 Interactive Latin Word Endings
 A Student's Latin Grammar'', by Cambridge Latin Course's Robin  Griffin, third edition
 
 

 

la:Declinatio (grammatica)